The following is a list of the 312 municipalities (comuni) of the Metropolitan City of Turin, Piedmont, Italy.

List

See also 
List of municipalities of Italy

References 

 01
Metropolitan City of Turin
Turin